Croswell-Parsons Paper Mill Ruin is the historic remains of an industrial structure and archaeological site located at New Baltimore in Greene County, New York.

It was listed on the National Register of Historic Places in 1996.

References

Archaeological sites on the National Register of Historic Places in New York (state)
Industrial buildings and structures on the National Register of Historic Places in New York (state)
Buildings and structures in Greene County, New York
National Register of Historic Places in Greene County, New York